Arslan Khan (born 16 April 1999) is a Canadian cricketer. In October 2019, he was named in Canada's squad for the 2019–20 Regional Super50 tournament in the West Indies. He made his List A debut on 8 November 2019, for Canada against the Leeward Islands, in the Regional Super50 tournament. Prior to his List A debut, he was named as the captain of Canada's squad for the 2018 Under-19 Cricket World Cup.

References

External links
 

1999 births
Living people
Canadian cricketers
Place of birth missing (living people)